Aaron Williams (born October 2, 1971) is an American former professional basketball player. He played at the power forward and center positions.

Basketball career
Williams was undrafted after a college career at Xavier University, and played for the NBA's Utah Jazz, Milwaukee Bucks, Denver Nuggets, Vancouver Grizzlies, Seattle SuperSonics, Washington Wizards, New Jersey Nets, Toronto Raptors, New Orleans/Oklahoma City Hornets and Los Angeles Clippers. He also had brief stints in the CBA, Italy and Greece (Ampelokipoi B.C.).

In 2000-01, as a member of the New Jersey Nets, Williams posted his best numbers as a pro, playing all 82 games while averaging 10.1 points and 7.2 rebounds per game, but also had the dubious distinction of leading the league in total personal fouls committed, with 319 (an average of 3.89 fouls per game).

On December 17, 2004, he was traded by the Nets to the Toronto Raptors along with Alonzo Mourning, Eric Williams, and two first round draft picks in exchange for Vince Carter.

On January 31, 2006, he was traded by the Raptors to the New Orleans/Oklahoma City Hornets in exchange for two second-round draft picks. On July 31, Williams signed a free agent contract with the Los Angeles Clippers. On March 28, 2008, after rarely having been used throughout two seasons, he was waived.

After a professional career spanning 15 years, he spent part of the 2011–12 season as a temporary assistant men's basketball coach at his alma mater, Xavier University in Cincinnati, Ohio.

Career statistics

NBA

Regular season

|-
| align="left" | 1993–94
| align="left" | Utah
| 6 || 0 || 2.0 || .250 || .000 || .000 || 0.5 || 0.2 || 0.0 || 0.0 || 0.7
|-
| align="left" | 1994–95
| align="left" | Milwaukee
| 15 || 0 || 4.8 || .333 || .000 || .667 || 1.3 || 0.0 || 0.1 || 0.4 || 1.6
|-
| align="left" | 1996–97
| align="left" | Denver
| 1 || 0 || 10.0 || .600 || .000 || .000 || 5.0 || 0.0 || 0.0 || 3.0 || 6.0
|-
| align="left" | 1996–97
| align="left" | Vancouver
| 32 || 1 || 17.3 || .573 || .000 || .673 || 4.3 || 0.5 || 0.5 || 0.8 || 6.2
|-
| align="left" | 1997–98
| align="left" | Seattle
| 65 || 9 || 11.6 || .523 || .000 || .776 || 2.3 || 0.2 || 0.3 || 0.6 || 4.6
|-
| align="left" | 1998–99
| align="left" | Seattle
| 40 || 2 || 11.5 || .423 || .000 || .730 || 3.2 || 0.6 || 0.4 || 0.6 || 4.0
|-
| align="left" | 1999–00
| align="left" | Washington
| 81 || 0 || 19.1 || .522 || .000 || .726 || 5.0 || 0.7 || 0.5 || 1.1 || 7.6
|-
| align="left" | 2000–01
| align="left" | New Jersey
| 82 || 25 || 28.5 || .457 || .000 || .787 || 7.2 || 1.1 || 0.7 || 1.4 || 10.2
|-
| align="left" | 2001–02
| align="left" | New Jersey
| 82 || 13 || 18.9 || .526 || .000 || .699 || 4.1 || 0.9 || 0.4 || 0.9 || 7.2
|-
| align="left" | 2002–03
| align="left" | New Jersey
| 81 || 0 || 19.7 || .453 || .000 || .785 || 4.1 || 1.1 || 0.3 || 0.7 || 6.2
|-
| align="left" | 2003–04
| align="left" | New Jersey
| 72 || 7 || 18.6 || .503 || .333 || .677 || 4.1 || 1.1 || 0.5 || 0.6 || 6.3
|-
| align="left" | 2004–05
| align="left" | New Jersey
| 19 || 0 || 7.9 || .519 || .000 || .900 || 1.6 || 0.3 || 0.2 || 0.3 || 1.9
|-
| align="left" | 2004–05
| align="left" | Toronto
| 23 || 4 || 7.2 || .417 || .000 || .857 || 1.3 || 0.1 || 0.0 || 0.1 || 1.6
|-
| align="left" | 2005–06
| align="left" | Toronto
| 14 || 3 || 7.1 || .526 || .000 || .833 || 1.1 || 0.1 || 0.3 || 0.2 || 1.8
|-
| align="left" | 2005–06
| align="left" | New Orleans/Oklahoma City
| 34 || 2 || 20.4 || .516 || .000 || .673 || 4.9 || 0.5 || 0.4 || 0.5 || 5.8
|-
| align="left" | 2006–07
| align="left" | Los Angeles
| 38 || 7 || 9.8 || .547 || .000 || .818 || 2.2 || 0.2 || 0.2 || 0.4 || 2.0
|-
| align="left" | 2007–08
| align="left" | Los Angeles
| 30 || 5 || 9.9 || .491 || .000 || .778 || 2.0 || 0.3 || 0.4 || 0.5 || 2.3
|- class="sortbottom"
| style="text-align:center;" colspan="2"| Career
| 715 || 78 || 16.8 || .493 || .063 || .740 || 3.9 || 0.7 || 0.4 || 0.8 || 5.8
|}

Playoffs

|-
| align="left" | 1997–98
| align="left" | Seattle
| 3 || 0 || 2.3 || .000 || .000 || 1.000 || 0.3 || 0.0 || 0.0 || 0.3 || 0.7
|-
| align="left" | 2001–02
| align="left" | New Jersey
| style="background:#cfecec;" | 20* || 0 || 20.8 || .479 || .000 || .826 || 3.5 || 0.8 || 0.4 || 0.8 || 6.5
|-
| align="left" | 2002–03
| align="left" | New Jersey
| 19 || 0 || 17.9 || .472 || .000 || .742 || 4.6 || 0.9 || 0.3 || 0.9 || 6.5
|-
| align="left" | 2003–04
| align="left" | New Jersey
| 11 || 0 || 13.5 || .545 || .000 || .600 || 2.0 || 0.4 || 0.0 || 0.6 || 3.8
|- class="sortbottom"
| style="text-align:center;" colspan="2"| Career
| 53 || 0 || 17.2 || .479 || .000 || .775 || 3.4 || 0.7 || 0.3 || 0.8 || 5.6
|}

College

|-
| align="left" | 1989–90
| align="left" | Xavier
| 28 || 1 || 9.9 || .574 || .000 || .400 || 2.7 || 0.2 || 0.2 || 1.0 || 2.2
|-
| align="left" | 1990–91
| align="left" | Xavier
| 32 || - || 26.8 || .536 || .000 || .714 || 6.5 || 1.0 || 0.8 || 1.8 || 9.7
|-
| align="left" | 1991–92
| align="left" | Xavier
| 27 || - || 29.1 || .585 || .000 || .699 || 8.0 || 1.1 || 0.6 || 2.1 || 13.9
|-
| align="left" | 1992–93
| align="left" | Xavier
| 30 || 20 || 28.1 || .543 || .000 || .777 || 7.1 || 1.8 || 0.7 || 1.8 || 10.9
|- class="sortbottom"
| style="text-align:center;" colspan="2"| Career
| 117 || 21 || 23.6 || .556 || .000 || .707 || 6.1 || 1.1 || 0.6 || 1.7 || 9.2
|}

References

External links
 NBA.com profile
 Hoopshype.com career and profile
 College Stats

1971 births
Living people
American expatriate basketball people in Canada
American expatriate basketball people in Croatia
American expatriate basketball people in Greece
American expatriate basketball people in Italy
American men's basketball coaches
American men's basketball players
Ampelokipoi B.C. players
Basketball coaches from Illinois
Basketball players from Illinois
Centers (basketball)
Connecticut Pride players
Denver Nuggets players
Grand Rapids Hoops players
KK Split players
Los Angeles Clippers players
Milwaukee Bucks players
New Jersey Nets players
New Orleans Hornets players
Power forwards (basketball)
Seattle SuperSonics players
Sportspeople from Evanston, Illinois
Toronto Raptors players
Undrafted National Basketball Association players
Utah Jazz players
Vancouver Grizzlies players
Washington Wizards players
Xavier Musketeers men's basketball coaches
Xavier Musketeers men's basketball players